Joseph Kekuku (1874–1932) is reportedly the inventor of the steel guitar.

Biography

Kekuku, also known as Joseph Kekuku’upenakana’iaupuniokamehameha Apuakehau, was born in Lāie, a village on the island of Oʻahu, Hawaii. When Joseph was 15, he and his cousin, Sam Nainoa left for a boarding school in Honolulu. In 1889 while attending the Kamehameha School for Boys, Kekuku accidentally discovered the sound of the steel guitar.

In an article first seen in 1932, C.S. DeLano, publisher of the "Hawaiian Music In Los Angeles" whose "Hawaiian Love Song" was the first original composition to be written for the Hawaiian Steel Guitar said: 
'"Joseph told me that he was walking along a road in Honolulu forty-two years ago, holding an old Spanish guitar, when he saw a rusty bolt on the ground.  As he picked it up, the bolt accidentally vibrated one of the strings and produced a new tone that was rather pleasing.  After practicing for a time with the metal bolt, Joe experimented with the back of a pocket-knife, then with the back of a steel comb, and still later on with a highly-polished steel [bar] very similar to the sort that is used today."'

In 1904 at the age of 30, Kekuku left Hawaii and would never return. He started in the United States by performing in vaudeville theaters from coast to coast. His group was "Kekuku's Hawaiian Quintet" and were sponsored by a management group called "The Affiliated."

In 1919, Kekuku left the U.S. for an eight-year tour of Europe traveling with "The Bird of Paradise" show. "The Bird of Paradise" show started on Broadway, and was well-received in Europe. 

Kekuku returned to America on board the United States Lines ocean liner SS Republic in October 1926. On the evening of October 3 he performed in the passenger-led benefit concert for seamen’s charities and the Actors Fund of the United States, as was customary on transatlantic crossings. In the programme from the evening he is referred to as “Mr. Joseph Kekuku (Originator of the Hawaiian Guitar Method)”.

"The Bird of Paradise" was so popular that it became a film in 1932 and again in 1951, though Kekuku was not in either film.

At the age of 53, Kekuku settled in Chicago and ran a popular and successful music school. In 1932 Joseph Kekuku lived in Dover, New Jersey, with his wife and gave Hawaiian guitar lessons.

Death and legacy
On January 16, 1932, at the age of 58, Kekuku died in Morristown, New Jersey, of a cerebral hemorrhage. Kekuku is buried in the Orchard Street Cemetery. 

In 1993, Joseph Kekuku was inducted into the Steel Guitar Hall of Fame with full honors as the inventor of the Hawaiian steel guitar. A statue of him was erected at the Polynesian Cultural Center in Hawaii in 2015.

References

External links 
 HMHFM Honorees - Joseph Kekuku at www.hawaiimusicmuseum.org
 Owana Salazar - About Hawaiian Steel Guitar at www.owanasalazar.com

1874 births
1932 deaths
Native Hawaiian musicians
People from Dover, New Jersey
People from Laie
Steel guitarists
Inventors from Hawaii